The Gorakhpur–Lokmanya Tilak Terminus Express is an express train belonging to North Eastern Railway zone that runs between Gorakhpur Junction and Lokmanya Tilak Terminus in India. It is currently being operated with 15063/15064 train numbers on a weekly basis.

Service

The 15063/Gorakhpur–Lokmanya Tilak Terminus Express has an average speed of 50 km/hr and covers 1746 km in 34h 50m. The 15064/Lokmanya Tilak Terminus–Gorakhpur Express has an average speed of 52 km/hr and covers 1746 km in 33h 25m.

Route and halts 

The important halts of the train are:

Coach composite

The train has standard ICF rakes with a max speed of 110 kmph. The train consists of 16 coaches:

 2 AC III Tier
 4 Sleeper Coaches
 8 General Unreserved
 2 Seating cum Luggage Rake

Traction

Both trains are hauled by a Gonda Loco Shed-based WDM-3A diesel locomotive from Gorakhpur to Lucknow. From Lucknow, train is hauled by a Valsad Loco Shed-based WAM-4 electric locomotive uptil Kurla and vice versa.

Rake sharing 

The train shares its rake with 15065/15066 Gorakhpur–Panvel Express (via Barhni) and 15067/15068 Gorakhpur–Bandra Terminus Express (via Barhni).

Notes

See also 

 Gorakhpur Junction railway station
 Lokmanya Tilak Terminus
 Lokmanya Express
 Gorakhpur–Panvel Express (via Barhni)
 Gorakhpur–Bandra Terminus Express (via Barhni)

References

External links 

 15063/Gorakhpur–Mumbai LTT Express (Via Barhni)
 15064/Mumbai LTT–Gorakhpur Express (via Barhni)

Passenger trains originating from Gorakhpur
Transport in Mumbai
Express trains in India
Rail transport in Madhya Pradesh
Rail transport in Maharashtra
Railway services introduced in 2016